Nemoria bistriaria, the red-fringed emerald or two-striped emerald,  is a species of moth of the  family Geometridae. It is found from New Brunswick to Florida, west to Texas, north to Ontario.

The wingspan is about 22 mm. Adults are on wing from March to October in the south and from May to August in the north. There are at least two generations per year.

The species occurs in a seasonal brown form where the green colour of the wings is entirely replaced by a light coffee colour.

The larvae of ssp. siccifolia feed on white oak, while larvae of the nominate subspecies have been recorded on eastern black walnut, black birch and oak.

Subspecies
Nemoria bistriaria bistriaria
Nemoria bistriaria siccifolia (Pennsylvania to southern Quebec and Ontario)

External links
Bug Guide

Geometrinae